Skillet Fork is a  river in southern Illinois in the United States.  It is a tributary of the Little Wabash River; via the Little Wabash, Wabash and Ohio rivers, it is part of the watershed of the Mississippi River.

The Skillet Fork rises in northeastern Marion County and flows generally southeastwardly through Clay, Wayne, Hamilton and White counties. In its lower course, parts of the river have been straightened and channelized.

See also
List of Illinois rivers

References

Columbia Gazetteer of North America entry
DeLorme (2003).  Illinois Atlas & Gazetteer.  Yarmouth, Maine: DeLorme.  .
Surfing Skillet Fork with USEPA

Rivers of Illinois
Rivers of Clay County, Illinois
Rivers of Hamilton County, Illinois
Rivers of Marion County, Illinois
Rivers of Wayne County, Illinois
Rivers of White County, Illinois